Sulibhavi  is a village in the southern state of Karnataka, India. It is located in the Hungund taluk of Bagalkot district in Karnataka.

Demographics
 India census, Shulibhavi had a population of 8898 with 4502 males and 4396 females.

See also
 Bagalkot
 Districts of Karnataka

References

External links
 http://Bagalkot.nic.in/

Villages in Bagalkot district